South Junior High School is a property in Grand Forks, North Dakota, United States, that was listed on the US National Register of Historic Places in 1999.

It includes Late Gothic Revival architecture.

References

School buildings on the National Register of Historic Places in North Dakota
Schools in Grand Forks County, North Dakota
School buildings completed in 1932
Defunct schools in North Dakota
National Register of Historic Places in Grand Forks, North Dakota
Gothic Revival architecture in North Dakota
1932 establishments in North Dakota